William Glenn Shadix (April 15, 1952 – September 7, 2010) was an American actor and comedian. He was known for his role as Otho in Tim Burton's horror comedy film Beetlejuice and as the voice of the Mayor of Halloween Town in The Nightmare Before Christmas.

Early life
Shadix was born on April 15, 1952 in Bessemer, Alabama, the eldest child in the family. His surname was legally changed to "Scott" when his mother, Annie Ruth (née Livingston), remarried a few years after his birth, although he would use his original surname when working as an actor. He attended Birmingham–Southern College for two years, studying with absurdist playwright-director Arnold Powell.

Career
He lived in Manhattan, New York City prior to moving to Hollywood in 1977. He got his breakthrough film role in Beetlejuice as interior decorator Otho, while appearing in The Groundlings comedy troupe and performing in the stage play Doctor Faustus Lights the Lights, portraying Gertrude Stein. Beetlejuice filmmaker Tim Burton went on to cast Shadix in 1993's The Nightmare Before Christmas, and the 2001 remake of Planet of the Apes. Throughout the 1990s he had small roles on iconic television shows, including Cheers, Roseanne and Seinfeld.

In 1995, Shadix was cast as Ray Cathode in the Space Mountain queue advertisements when the ride was sponsored by FedEx.

In 2005, Shadix was cast as the voices of the Brain and Monsieur Mallah in season five of the Teen Titans animated series. His other voice work includes the aforementioned Nightmare, and episodes of Jackie Chan Adventures and Justice League Unlimited (where he played Steven Mandragora). He reprised his Nightmare Before Christmas role in the video game The Nightmare Before Christmas: Oogie's Revenge, and the Square Enix video game Kingdom Hearts II.

His television work included the HBO drama Carnivàle, the NBC television comedy Seinfeld, in which he played Jerry's landlord, and playing the roles of giant brothers Typhoon and Typhon in Hercules: The Legendary Journeys. On stage, Shadix was set to begin rehearsals for a Birmingham production of Alan Bennett's History Boys.

Personal life
According to an interview with the Truth Wins Out website, Shadix came out as gay at the age of 17. His parents then enrolled him in "ex-gay therapy", which included shock treatments. When this failed to change his orientation, he attempted suicide by overdosing with Elavil. His parents rushed him to a hospital, where he survived a three-day coma. After the incident, his parents began to accept his sexuality.

In 2007, after spending 30 years in Los Angeles, he retired to his native Bessemer, Alabama, where he purchased a Queen Anne-style, Victorian-era home. The house was completely destroyed in a fire on December 13, 2008. Shadix told reporters, "I have lost my dream."

Death
On September 7, 2010, according to Shadix's sister, Susan Gagne, he fell in the kitchen at his condominium in Birmingham, Alabama, and died of blunt trauma to his head. Shadix had mobility problems and was in a wheelchair.

Filmography

Film

Television

Video games

References

External links 

 
 Shadix's Website

1952 births
2010 deaths
Male actors from Alabama
American male comedians
20th-century American male actors
21st-century American comedians
20th-century American comedians
21st-century American male actors
American male film actors
American male television actors
American male voice actors
Birmingham–Southern College alumni
American gay actors
People from Bessemer, Alabama
LGBT people from Alabama
Accidental deaths from falls
Accidental deaths in Alabama